Charles Christopher "Dutch" Schrader (July 20, 1893 – November 16, 1967) was an American football, basketball, and baseball player for the Kentucky Wildcats of the University of Kentucky. During the First World War he served with the United States Navy.

Early years
Charles C. Schrader was born on July 20, 1893, in Philadelphia, Pennsylvania to Christopf Schrader and Mary Vander Borgt.

University of Kentucky
Schrader was selected as an All-Southern fullback in 1915, a year in which he was captain.

Music
Schrader was a member of the Lancaster Symphony Orchestra for some 20 years.

References

1893 births
1967 deaths
All-Southern college football players
Kentucky Wildcats football players
Kentucky Wildcats men's basketball players
Kentucky Wildcats baseball players
Players of American football from Philadelphia
American men's basketball players
Basketball players from Philadelphia
Forwards (basketball)
Baseball players from Philadelphia